Tin Oo (born 11 March 1927), often referred to as U Tin Oo, is a Burmese politician, activist and retired general in the Armed Forces who was one of the founders of the National League for Democracy (NLD) in Myanmar, the country's largest pro-democracy political party.

Military career
Tin Oo joined the military on 26 February 1946 as a second lieutenant in Burma Rifles Battalion. He reached the ranks of lieutenant on 7 January 1947, captain on 27 September 1948 and served as executive officer at Armed Forces Training Headquarters. On 22 June 1949, he was transferred to No. 1 Burma Rifles Battalion as company commander. He was promoted to the rank of major on 25 January 1950 and became deputy battalion commander (2IC) of the No. 1 Burma Rifles Battalion and took over the position of acting battalion commander on 27 November 1952.

He was promoted to lieutenant colonel on 21 January 1954 and became commander of the 4th Infantry Brigade on 30 May 1957. He was then transferred to Officers Training School, Bahtoo as commandant on 13 September 1957. Throughout 1958 and 1961, he served as the battalion commander for the No. 14 Infantry Battalion (starting 18 November 1959) and No. 2 Burma Rifle Battalion (from 16 February 1962) and after his promotion as colonel, he became acting commander for the No. 13 Infantry Brigade (from 20 February 1962).

He was then given the command of South West Regional Military Command and promoted to the rank of colonel on 14 February 1964. On 19 September 1964 he became commander of Central Regional Military Command. He was then promoted to the rank of brigadier general and became deputy chief of staff of the Tatmadaw on 20 April 1972. On 8 March 1974 he was promoted to the rank of general and became commander in chief of the Tatmadaw. He was armed forces commander in chief during the bloody crackdown on student protests surrounding the funeral of former UN Secretary General U Thant.

During his military career, Tin Oo was awarded with the Thura medal, a prestigious award for gallantry and bravery in the face of the enemy that can be awarded to members of the Myanmar Armed Forces. He led both tactical and strategic campaigns against the Karen National Union as well as the Communist Party of Burma and various ethnic armed groups, especially in the north and east of the country.

Forced retirement, accusations and imprisonment 
On 6 March 1976, as per Order no. 26/76 issued by the Council of State, Tin Oo was forced to retired from his position as Commander in Chief of the Tatmadaw. According to the official explanation released by the then ruling party, the Burma Socialist Programme Party, he was forced to retire because Dr. Daw Tin Moe Wai, his wife, broke the rules and regulations laid down for the spouses of commanding officers of the Tatmadaw by accepting numerous bribes, thus affecting General Tin Oo's position.

After his forced retirement, he was accused of high treason against the armed forces, the party (BSPP) and the state. He was subsequently arrested and tried for the alleged withholding of information concerning a failed coup-d'état against General Ne Win and the Council of State. On 11 January 1977, Judge U Ohn Maung, Chairman of the Divisional Justice Committee for the Yangon Division sentenced him to 7 years of hard labour and imprisonment according to the Crime Against State and High Treasons Act 124. Tin Oo's subsequent appeal for this judgement on 20 August 1977 was summarily dismissed by Judge Soe Hlaing of the Council of People's Justice, the equivalent of a Supreme Court, and upheld the judgement handed out by Yangon Division Justice Committee. Colonel Hla Pe, commander of Northern Regional Command, Colonel Maung Maung, Colonel General Staff and Colonel Myo Aung, commandant of the National Defence College were also dismissed and the former two were imprisoned along with General Tin Oo.

Political career 
He was released under general amnesty in 1980, after which he studied and received a degree in law. On 2 September 1988, he became the vice president of the National League for Democracy (NLD), and on 20 December, the President of NLD. On 20 July 1989, he was put under house arrest and starting on 22 December 1989, he was imprisoned for three years.

On 30 May 2003, Tin Oo, travelling with the caravan of Aung San Suu Kyi, leader of the NLD, was attacked in the northern village of Depayin by a government-sponsored mob, murdering and wounding many of his supporters. Tin Oo was taken into detention along with Aung San Suu Kyi and was initially held in prison in Kalay in northwestern Myanmar. In February 2004 he was brought back to his home in Yangon, where he was actually held under house arrest.
The junta extended his detention by one year in February 2007, 2008, and 2009. The last of these extensions was in violation of Burmese law at the time, but no explanation was given by the junta. He was released from house arrest on 13 February 2010.

See also

Military of Myanmar
Myanmar Army
National League for Democracy

Notes

External links
UK Foreign Office Facebook page

|-

|-

1927 births
Burmese prisoners and detainees
Burmese democracy activists
Burmese generals
Burmese soldiers
Civil rights activists
Living people
National League for Democracy politicians
People from Ayeyarwady Region
Prisoners and detainees of Myanmar
Recipients of the Order of the Union of Myanmar
Political prisoners
Defence ministers of Myanmar
Officers Training School, Bahtoo alumni